Mount Selby is a mountain rising over 2,200 m between Mount Henderson and Mount Olympus in Britannia Range. Named by the New Zealand Antarctic Place-Names Committee (NZ-APC) for Michael Selby, Professor of Earth Sciences, University of Waikato, Hamilton, New Zealand. Selby was a member of field parties in Antarctica, 1969–70, 1971–72, and 1978–79, the last doing geological work in Britannia Range.

Mountains of Oates Land